László Tóth (born 9 February 1968) is a Hungarian former water polo player. He competed at the 1988 Summer Olympics, the 1992 Summer Olympics and the 1996 Summer Olympics.

See also
 List of World Aquatics Championships medalists in water polo

References

External links
 

1968 births
Living people
Hungarian male water polo players
Olympic water polo players of Hungary
Water polo players at the 1988 Summer Olympics
Water polo players at the 1992 Summer Olympics
Water polo players at the 1996 Summer Olympics
People from Szentes
Sportspeople from Csongrád-Csanád County
20th-century Hungarian people
21st-century Hungarian people